Jakub Straka (born 17 June 1997) is a Slovak football defender who currently plays for 3. liga club MFK Vranov nad Topľou, on loan from FC Lokomotíva Košice.

Club career

1. FC Tatran Prešov
Straka made his professional Fortuna Liga debut for 1. FC Tatran Prešov against MFK Ružomberok on 16 July 2016.

References

External links
 MFK Zemplín Michalovce official club profile
 Fortuna Liga profile
 
 Eurofotbal profile
 Futbalnet profile

1997 births
Living people
Slovak footballers
Association football defenders
MFK Zemplín Michalovce players
1. FC Tatran Prešov players
FC Lokomotíva Košice players
MFK Vranov nad Topľou players
Slovak Super Liga players
People from Vranov nad Topľou
Sportspeople from the Prešov Region